The men's road race cycling event at the 2015 European Games in Baku took place on 21 June.

Results

References

Men's road race
2015 in men's road cycling